Dicopomorpha zebra is a species of fairyfly within the family Mymaridae. The species distribution is in the Afrotropical regions of Gabon, Ivory Coast, and Nigeria.

References 

Insects described in 2009
Mymaridae
Insects of Gabon
Insects of West Africa